The Astronauts is an American action-adventure television series that aired on Nickelodeon from November 13, 2020 to January 15, 2021. The series stars Miya Cech, Bryce Gheisar, Keith L. Williams, Kayden Grace Swan, and Ben Daon, as well as features the voice of Paige Howard.

Premise 
Five children sneak onto a spaceship and the ship's artificial intelligence Matilda sends them into space. The children have to find their way back to Earth while doing a space mission and attempting to keep the spaceship from breaking down.

Cast 
 Miya Cech as Samantha "Samy" Sawyer-Wei, the commander of the Odyssey II crew and is the daughter of Rebecca Sawyer and Molly Wei
 Bryce Gheisar as Elliott Combs, the son of Griffin Combs and nephew of Singer Combs
 Keith L. Williams as Martin Taylor, the son of Niles Taylor and the older brother of Doria Taylor
 Kayden Grace Swan as Doria Taylor, the daughter of Niles Taylor and younger sibling of Martin Taylor
 Ben Daon as Will Rivers, the son of Connie Rivers
 Paige Howard as the voice of Matilda, the Odyssey II A.I. program who planned for the children’s space launch and is the creation of Singer Combs

Production 
On June 18, 2019, it was announced that Imagine Kids & Family was developing an untitled scripted space series for Nickelodeon. Daniel Knauf served as showrunner, executive producer, and writer. Brian Grazer, Ron Howard, and Stephanie Sperber served as executive producers. Production for the series was overseen by Shauna Phelan. On February 19, 2020, an action-adventure single-camera television series under the working title of The Astronauts was ordered by Nickelodeon for 10 episodes, with an initial premiere set for summer 2020. On October 9, 2020, it was announced that the series would have an hour-long premiere on November 13, 2020. Starring in the series were Miya Cech as Samantha "Samy" Sawyer-Wei, Bryce Gheisar as Elliott Combs, Keith L. Williams as Martin Taylor, Kayden Grace Swan as Doria Taylor, Ben Daon as Will Rivers, and Paige Howard as the voice of Matilda. Daniel Knauf also served as series creator. Dean Israelite and Jonathan Frakes served as directors.

Episodes

Reception

Ratings 
 
}}

Awards and nominations

Notes

References

External links 
 
 

2020s American children's television series
2020s Nickelodeon original programming
2020 American television series debuts
2021 American television series endings
American action adventure television series
English-language television shows
Television series by Imagine Entertainment